The Băbeni oil field is an oil field located in Băbeni, Vâlcea County. It was discovered in 1974 and developed by Petrom. It began production in 1975 and produces oil and natural gas.

References

Oil fields in Romania